The 2015 Lotto FIM Grand Prix of Poland was the opening race of the 2015 Speedway Grand Prix season. It took place on April 18 at Stadion Narodowy in Warsaw, Poland.

Riders 
The Speedway Grand Prix Commission nominated Tomasz Gollob as the wild card, and Bartosz Zmarzlik and Piotr Pawlicki Jr. both as Track Reserves.

Results 
The Grand Prix was won by Matej Žagar, who beat Chris Harris, Jarosław Hampel and Niels-Kristian Iversen. After safety issues with the track, the meeting was abandoned after 12 heats, with each rider having ridden three times. The result stood, as per FIM rule 077.1.4.1., shown below.

Heat details

Intermediate classification

References

See also 
 motorcycle speedway

2015 Speedway Grand Prix
2015 in Polish speedway